Doru Dudiţă (born 7 September 1977) is a retired Romanian footballer, currently a coach. As a player Dudiță played mostly for Gaz Metan Mediaş, with short episodes at FCM Bacău, Unirea Alba Iulia, FC Sibiu or Voința Sibiu, among others.

External links
 
 
 

1977 births
Living people
Sportspeople from Râmnicu Vâlcea
Romanian footballers
Association football midfielders
Liga I players
Liga II players
FCM Bacău players
CSM Unirea Alba Iulia players
CS Gaz Metan Mediaș players
CSU Voința Sibiu players